Joseph Waugh (born 28 July 1952) is a British former cyclist. He competed at the 1976 Summer Olympics and the 1980 Summer Olympics. He also represented England and won a gold medal in the team time trial, at the 1982 Commonwealth Games in Brisbane, Queensland, Australia.

References

External links
 

1952 births
Living people
British male cyclists
Olympic cyclists of Great Britain
Cyclists at the 1976 Summer Olympics
Cyclists at the 1980 Summer Olympics
Place of birth missing (living people)
Commonwealth Games medallists in cycling
Commonwealth Games gold medallists for England
Cyclists at the 1982 Commonwealth Games
Medallists at the 1982 Commonwealth Games